Matt Kelley (born 1978) is a mixed-race Korean-American writer, public speaker and consultant born in Spokane, Washington, and living in Seoul, South Korea.

He is the co-editor of the Multiracial Child Resource Book: Living Complex Identities (2003) with Maria P. P. Root and is producer of the documentary film, Chasing Daybreak: A Film About Mixed Race in America (2006), which features U.S. President Barack Obama.

In 1998, as a 19-year-old, first-year student at Wesleyan University, Kelley created MAVIN magazine, one of the first print publications about racially mixed people. In 2000, he founded the Seattle, Washington-based Mavin Foundation, a 501(c)3 not-for-profit organization whose mission is to build “healthy communities that celebrate and empower mixed heritage people and families". Under his direction the organization created projects including the award-winning MatchMaker Bone Marrow Project, the Mixed Heritage Center and the Generation MIX National Awareness Tour. He left the organization in 2006 but continues to serve on its Board of Advisors.

Kelley is recognized as a spokesperson for multiracial Americans. He frequently appears in media and has received several awards, including being named a "Point of Light" by President George W. Bush. In 2004, as vice president of the Association of MultiEthnic Americans, he was the multiracial representative on the U.S. Department of Commerce's Decennial Census Advisory Committee. In 2005 he presented testimony to Congress about mixed-race health concerns.

Kelley has volunteered with several organizations that work with youth, Asian American, African American and lesbian and gay issues.

External links

References

General
Official website
Notable Wesleyan University alumni
MAVIN Foundation (Official website)

Published Work
 From 50 to 1,500: Korea Queer Culture Festival turns 10 by Matt Kelley Fridae.com. June 16, 2009
 South Korea's legal trans-formation by Matt Kelley and Mike Lee Fridae.com. May 29, 2009
Beauty vs. Brawn by Matt Kelley and Uikwon Lee Theme Magazine. Issue 19 Spring 2009
One Box Isn't Enough: An Analysis of How U.S. Colleges and Universities Classify Mixed Heritage Students by Alfredo Padilla with Matt Kelley Mavin Foundation. November 9, 2005

Articles
(organized by most recent)
Mavin: One who understands by Julie Dexter, Washington Health Foundation. Winter 2007
Black and White and read all over by Naomi Pabst, The Village Voice. January 31, 2006
It's time for 'Generation Mix' by Mireya Navarro, Taipei Times. April 26, 2005
When you contain multitudes by Mireya Navarro, New York Times. April 24, 2005
Former 'Others' show their pride by Janie Magruder, The Arizona Republic. April 8, 2005
Coast-to-coast Mix RV tour an interracial celebration by Jason Johnson, San Francisco Chronicle. April 7, 2005
Mixed-race youth are on a literal drive to find their identity by John Iwasaki, Seattle Times. April 4, 2005
Seeing mixed races through the eyes of new generation by Jerry Large, Seattle Times. March 31, 2005
Race isn't as clear as black and white by Florangela Davila, Seattle Times. January 17, 2005
Multiracial and proud! Multiracial teens are claiming their own identities and changing our notion of race by John DiConsiglio, Scholastic Choices. September 2004
Multiracial Youth in Care by Lisette Austin, The Connection. April 2004
Foundation helps those of mixed race by John Iwasaki, Seattle Post-Intelligencer. March 20, 2004
Group holds Marrow-Thon to find multiracial donors by Jean Stevens, The Daily Orange. November 13, 2002
Kelley's foundation springs from multiracial heritage by Steve Wilhelm, Puget Sound Business Journal. September 13, 2002
Multiracial - a new way of thinking by D. Parvaz, Seattle Post-Intelligencer. March 14, 2001
Impact of Census' race data debated by Martin Kasindorf and Haya El Nasser, USA Today. March 13, 2001
Census 'can of worms' makes experts squirm by Stuart Eskenazi, Seattle Times. March 13, 2001
Changing the way we think about race by Solomon Moore, Los Angeles Times. March 5, 2001
Who wants to be an entrepreneur? by Theresa O'Rourke, Link Magazine. May 2000
Birth of a Maven: Matt Kelley's brave new magazine targets a mixed-race world by Andy Steiner, Utne Reader. September/October 1999

1978 births
Living people
American book editors
American consultants
American documentary filmmakers
American non-fiction writers
People from Spokane, Washington
American magazine founders
American people of Korean descent
Multiracial affairs in the United States
Wesleyan University alumni